The Permanent Vacation Tour, by American hard rock band Aerosmith, lasted from October 1987 to September 1988. It supported the band's commercially successful comeback album Permanent Vacation, released in September 1987.

Background
The tour was the band's first since completing drug rehabilitation. Guns N' Roses, notorious for drug abuse at the time, was the supporting act for part of the tour, primarily during the summer of 1988. Aerosmith asked Guns to not do drugs in their presence, so they wouldn't relapse. "I told those guys, 'This is my dressing room and, if you whip out the coke, I'm going to have to leave,'" Steven Tyler recalled. "That was it. Then it was printed that we banned them from drinking backstage. Never."

The two bands had a similar style, musically and personality-wise, and were both on Geffen Records at the time. Upon their first meeting, the band members couldn't help but notice how much they resembled each other. Guns N' Roses' video for "Paradise City" included footage from a show in which they opened for Aerosmith and Deep Purple at Giants Stadium on August 16, 1988. Duff McKagan can be seen wearing an Aerosmith T-shirt in the video.

"Thank God we got to meet some people that weren't fucked up!" remarked Guns guitarist Izzy Stradlin. "It influenced me, big-time… cos Tyler and those guys, they were always like my rock idols… When we toured with them, I'd go out to watch and they'd sound fucking amazing! I thought, We're gonna have to really pull this shit together to keep up."

Extreme, Dokken and White Lion also filled opening slots on the tour.

During a show on this tour, Liv Tyler, aged 11 at the time, learned that her sister was Mia Tyler and her father was Steven Tyler.

Tour dates

Setlist 
The band consistently played six tracks from Permanent Vacation: the major singles "Dude (Looks Like a Lady)", "Angel", and "Rag Doll", as well as the rock radio hit "Hangman Jury", the rocking title track, and the Beatles cover "I'm Down".  The band also played numerous songs from their classic 1973–1982 era.  A typical setlist would be this:

 "Toys in the Attic"
 "Same Old Song and Dance
 "Big Ten Inch Record"
 "Dude (Looks Like a Lady)"
 "Lightning Strikes"
 "Rag Doll"
 "Hangman Jury"
 "Permanent Vacation"
 "Angel"
 "Back in the Saddle"
 "Last Child"
 "Draw the Line"
 "Rats in the Cellar"
 "One Way Street"
 "Dream On"
 "Train Kept A-Rollin'"
 "Sweet Emotion"
 "I'm Down"
 "Walk This Way"

References

Aerosmith concert tours
1987 concert tours
1988 concert tours